Gu Long (7 June 1938 – 21 September 1985), was a Hong Kong-born Taiwanese novelist, screenwriter, film producer and director. A graduate of Cheng Kung Senior High School and Tamkang University, Xiong is best known for writing wuxia novels and serials, which include Juedai Shuangjiao, Xiaoli Feidao Series, Chu Liuxiang Series, Lu Xiaofeng Series and The Eleventh Son. Some of these works have been adapted into films and television series for numerous times. In the 1980s, he started his own film studio, Bao Sian (寶龍), to produce film adaptations of his works.

Life
Xiong was born on 7 June 1938 in Hong Kong but his registered identity stated that he was born in 1941. His ancestral home was in Nanchang, Jiangxi Province, China, and he lived in Hankou in his childhood. He moved to Taipei, Taiwan in 1952 with his parents, who divorced in 1956. With help from his friends and using the money he earned from part-time work to fund his education, Xiong graduated from the Foreign Language Department of Tamkang University.

Career 
Xiong worked at the United States Army Advisory in Taipei.

In 1960, Xiong published his first wuxia novel, Cangqiong Shenjian, under the pen name "Gu Long". From 1960 to 1961, Xiong published eight novels but did not achieve the results he desired. He moved to Ruifang District (in New Taipei City) and lived there for three years, after which he changed his perspective and adopted a new writing style. Between 1967 and the late 1970s, he rose to prominence in the genre of modern wuxia fiction for his works. As the sole representative of excellence in the wuxia genre from Taiwan for an entire decade, Xiong was named along with Jin Yong and Liang Yusheng as the "Three Legs of the Tripod of Wuxia".

Personal life 
While Xiong was still in university, Xiong lived with a dance hostess, Zheng Yuexia, and had a son, Zheng Xiaolong, with her. However, he started a relationship later with another dance hostess, Ye Xue, who also bore him a son, Ye Yikuan. Shortly after that, he met a senior middle school graduate, Mei Baozhu, who became his first legal spouse and bore him his third son, Xiong Zhengda. His extramarital affairs caused him to break up with Mei eventually.

In the later part of his life, Xiong suffered from depression and the quality of his works declined rapidly. He had to employ ghostwriters to co-write many of his later works because of his ailing health.

On 21 September 1985, Xiong died at the age of 48. Xiong's death was caused by illness wrought by alcoholism – namely cirrhosis and esophageal hemorrhage. His friends brought him 48 bottles of XO Cognac at his funeral.

Writing style
Xiong was said to be influenced not only by wuxia fiction, but also by the works of Ernest Hemingway, Jack London, John Steinbeck and Friedrich Nietzsche. His novels are usually made up of short sentences and paragraphs, and mostly dialogues between characters – like a play script.

In contrast with Xiong, other writers such as Jin Yong and Liang Yusheng took an alternative route in writing wuxia fiction by incorporating Chinese history, culture and philosophical ideas in their works. Xiong initially intended to follow them but changed his decision after exposure to works such as the James Bond series and The Godfather novels. The influence of these works, which relied on the idiosyncrasies of human life, razor-sharp wit, poetic philosophies, mysterious plots and spine-tingling thrills to achieve success, enabled Xiong to come up with a unique way of writing.

List of works
Some of these works were co-written with other writers.

Standalone novels
 Divine Sword of the Sky (蒼穹神劍)
 Poison of the Sword and Fragrance of Plum Blossoms (劍毒梅香)
 Eerie Moon and Evil Star (月異星邪)
 Consort Xiang's Sword (湘妃劍)
 Legend of the Orphaned Star (孤星傳)
 Story of the Lost Soul (失魂引)
 Tale of the Wandering Swordsman (遊俠錄)
 The Flower-Guarding Bell (護花鈴)
 The Tune of the Colourful Ring (彩環曲)
 Broken Gold, Incomplete Jade (殘金缺玉)
 Lingering Fragrance in a Rain of Swords (飄香劍雨)
 Tale of a Remarkable Sword (劍玄錄)
 Journey of a Swordsman (劍客行)
 Cleansing Flowers, Refining the Sword (浣花洗劍錄)
 Lover's Arrow (情人箭)
 The Legend of the Banner Heroes (大旗英雄傳)
 Unofficial History of the Wulin (武林外史)
 The Sword and Exquisiteness (名劍風流)
 Legendary Siblings (絕代雙驕)
 Happy Heroes (歡樂英雄)
 The Celebrity (大人物)
 Meteor, Butterfly, Sword (流星‧蝴蝶‧劍)
 The Seven Killers (七殺手)
 Sword of the Third Young Master (三少爺的劍)
 The Jade Tiger (白玉老虎)
 Carved Jade Dragon  (白玉雕龍)
 Flying Eagle over the Great Land (大地飛鷹)
 Full Moon and Curved Saber (圓月彎刀)
 Heroes Shed No Tears (英雄無淚)
 The Seven Stars Dragon King (七星龍王)
 The Sounds of the Saber Accompanied by Wind Chimes (風鈴中的刀聲)
 Furious Sword, Mad Flowers (怒劍狂花)
 The Romance of that Sword (那一劍的風情)
 Righteous Blood Cleansing the Silver Spear (碧血洗銀槍)
 Thorn of the Chrysanthemum (菊花的刺)
 Iron Sword Beauty (鐵劍紅顏)
 The Indignant Foal (憤怒的小馬)

Little Li Flying Dagger series (小李飛刀系列)
 Sentimental Swordsman, Ruthless Sword (多情劍客無情劍)
 Bordertown Wanderer (邊城浪子)
 Eagle Soaring in the Ninth Month (九月鷹飛)
 Horizon, Bright Moon, Saber (天涯‧明月‧刀)
 Flying Dagger, Flying Dagger Appears Again (飛刀，又見飛刀)

The Eleventh Son series (蕭十一郎系列)
 The Eleventh Son (蕭十一郎)
 To Destroy the Eleventh Son (火併蕭十一郎)

Chu Liuxiang series (楚留香系列)
 Fragrance in the Sea of Blood (血海飄香)
 The Vast Desert (大沙漠)
 The Thrush (畫眉鳥)
 The Legend of the Bat (蝙蝠傳奇)
 Phantom Love and Heroic Romance (鬼戀俠情)
 The Legend of the Peach Blossom (桃花傳奇)
 The Legend of the New Moon (新月傳奇)
 The Midnight Orchid (午夜蘭花)

Lu Xiaofeng series (陸小鳳系列)
 The Legend of Lu Xiaofeng (陸小鳳傳奇)
 The Embroidery Bandit (繡花大盜)
 Before and After the Duel (決戰前後)
 The Silver Hook Gambling House (銀鈎賭坊)
 Phantom Manor (幽靈山莊)
 The Phoenix Dances in the Nine Heavens (鳳舞九天)
 Laughter of the Sword God (劍神一笑)

Seven Weapons series (七種武器系列)
 The Longevity Sword (長生劍)
 The Peacock Tassel (孔雀翎)
 The Green Jade Saber (碧玉刀)
 The Amorous Ring (多情環)
 The Overlord Spear (霸王槍)
 The Separation Hook (離別鉤)
 The Fist (拳頭)

Grand Era of Wuxia series (大武俠時代)
 Gamble, Wolf's Teeth, Pursue-and-kill (賭局、狼牙、追殺)
 Purple Fumes, Skulk of Foxes (紫煙、群狐)
 Silver Condor, Sea Deity (銀雕、海神)

The Six Shocking Tales series (驚魂六記系列)
 The Blood Parrot (血鸚鵡)
 The Sky Demon Saber (天魔刀)
 The Black Lizard (黑蜥蜴)
 The Crystal Man (水晶人)
 The Powdery Skeleton (粉骷髏)
 The Rakshasa Lady (羅剎女)
 The Wingless Bat (無翼蝙蝠)

Adaptations of works

Films
 The Jade Faced Assassin 玉面俠 (1971), Juedai Shuangjiao
 Killer Clans 流星·蝴蝶·劍 (1976), Liuxing Hudie Jian
 Clans of Intrigue 楚留香 (1977), Chu Liuxiang Series
 Jade Tiger 白玉老虎 (1977), Bai Yu Lao Hu
 Death Duel 三少爺的劍 (1977)
 The Lost Swordship 飄香劍雨 (1977), Lingering Fragrance in a Rain of Swords
 To Kill with Intrigue 劍·花·煙雨·江南 (1977)
 The Sentimental Swordsman 多情劍客無情劍 (1977), Xiaoli Feidao Series
 Legend of the Bat 楚留香之二蝙蝠傳奇 (1978), Chu Liuxiang Series
 Clan of Amazons 陸小鳳之绣花大盗 (1978), Lu Xiaofeng Series
 The Last Duel 英雄對英雄 (1978), Lu Xiaofeng Series
 Murder Plot 孔雀王朝(1979), Kong Que Wang Chao
 Full Moon Scimitar 新圆月弯刀 (1979), Full Moon Curved Saber
 The Lover's Arrow(ATV ver.)/The Cupid Strikes(RTV ver.) 情人箭 (1979), Lover's Arrow
 The Legend of Broken Sword 折劍傳奇 (1979), Chu Liuxiang Series
 The Proud Twins 绝代雙驕 (1979)
 Chu Liu Hsiang and Hu Tieh Hua 楚留香與胡鐵花 (1980), Chu Liuxiang Series
 Everlasting Chivalry 俠影留香 (1980), Chu Liuxiang Series
 The Sun Moon Legend 新月传奇 (1980), Chu Liuxiang Series
 Middle Kingdom's Mark of Blood 中原一點红 (1980), Chu Liuxiang Series
 Heroes Shed No Tears 英雄無淚 (1980)
 A Sword Named Revenge 名劍風流 (1981)
 Bloody Parrot 血鸚鵡 (1981)
 The Duel of the Century 陸小鳳之决戰前後 (1981), Lu Xiaofeng Series
 Clan Feuds 大旗英雄传 (1982) 
 The Spirit of the Sword 浣花洗劍錄 (1982), Wanhua Xijian Lu
 Perils of the Sentimental Swordsman 楚留香之幽靈山莊 (1982), Chu Liuxiang Series
 Demon Fighter 午夜蘭花 (1983)
 The Denouncement of Chu Liu Hsiang 楚留香大結局 (1983), Chu Liuxiang Series
 Handsome Siblings 絕代雙驕 (1992), Juedai Shuangjiao
 Butterfly and Sword 流星蝴蝶劍 (1993), Liuxing Hudie Jian
 Legend of the Liquid Sword 笑俠楚留香 (1993), Chu Liuxiang Series
 A Warrior's Tragedy 邊城浪子 (1993), Xiaoli Feidao series
 Clan of Amazon 陸小鳳傳奇之鳳舞九天 (1996), Lu Xiaofeng Series The Legend of the Flying Swordsman 小李飛刀之飛刀外傳 (2000), Xiaoli Feidao series The Duel 决戰紫禁之巓 (2000), Lu Xiaofeng Series The Master Swordsman Returns 陸小鳳第二部曲 - 鳳舞九天 (2002), Lu Xiaofeng spin-off Kung Fu Divas (2014), parody of Juedai Shuangjiao Sword Master (2016), Sword of the Third Young Master Chief of Thieves: Chu Liu Xiang 盗帅楚留香 (2021), Chu Liuxiang seriesGames
 New Gulong Online, developed by Zealot Digital International Corp and released by IAH in Southeast Asia.

Television

 Luk Siu-fung 陆小凤 (1976), Lu Xiaofeng Series Juedai Shuangjiao 绝代双骄 (1977), Juedai Shuangjiao The Romantic Swordsman 小李飞刀 (1978), Xiaoli Feidao Series Siu Sak Yaklong蕭十一郎 (1978), The Eleventh Son Series Chor Lau-heung 楚留香 (1979), Chu Liuxiang Series The Twins 绝代双骄 (1979), Juedai Shuangjiao Wan Fa Sai Kim Luk (1979), Wanhua Xijian Lu The New Adventures of Chor Lau-heung 楚留香之蝙蝠传奇 (1984), Chu Liuxiang Series Chor Lau-heung 楚留香新传 (1985), Chu Liuxiang Series Xin Juedai Shuangjiao 新绝代双骄 (1986), Juedai Shuangjiao The Return of Luk Siu-fung 陆小凤之凤舞九天 (1986), Lu Xiaofeng Series Two Most Honorable Knights 绝代双骄 (1988), Juedai Shuangjiao The Black Sabre (1989), Xiaoli Feidao series Against the Blade of Honour 圆月弯刀 (1994), Yuanyue Wandao Chor Lau-heung 香帅传奇 (1995), Chu Liuxiang Series The Romantic Swordsman 小李飞刀 (1995), Xiaoli Feidao Series Fan ren Yang Datou (no english title) (1996), 大人物 Mission of the Warriors  武林外史 (2001), Unofficial History of the Wulin Master Swordsman Lu Xiaofeng 陆小凤之决战前后 (2001), Lu Xiaofeng Series Master Swordsman Lu Xiaofeng 2 陆小凤之凤舞九天 (2001), Lu Xiaofeng Series The New Adventures of Chor Lau-heung 新楚留香 (2001), Chu Liuxiang Series The Legendary Siblings 绝代双骄 (2002), Juedai Shuangjiao The Legendary Siblings 2 绝世双骄 (2002), Juedai Shuangjiao Treasure Raiders (2002) (CTV version), 蕭十一郎 (Xiao Shi Yi Lang) Treasure Raiders (2002) (TVB version), 蕭十一郎 (Xiao Shi Yi Lang) Flying Daggers 飞刀又见飞刀 (2003), Xiaoli Feidao Series Meteor, Butterfly, Sword 流星‧蝴蝶‧劍 (2003), (Liu Xing, Hu Die, Jian)
 The Proud Twins 小鱼儿与花无缺 (2005), Juedai Shuangjiao The Legend of Lu Xiaofeng 陆小凤传奇 (2006), Lu Xiaofeng Series The Legend of Chu Liuxiang 楚留香传奇 (2007), Chu Liuxiang Series The Banner Heroes (2007), Da Qi Ying Xiong Zhuan Da Ren Wu (Big Shot) (2007), The Celebrity(大人物)
 The Spirit of the Sword (2007), Wanhua Xijian Lu The Legend of Brown Sugar Chivalries 黑糖瑪奇朵 (2008)
 Meteor, Butterfly, Sword 流星‧蝴蝶‧劍 (2010), (Liu Xing, Hu Die, Jian)
 Kong Que Ling 七種武器系列 (2011) (Qizhong Wuqi)
 The Legend of Chu Liuxiang 楚留香新传 (2012), Chu Liuxiang Series Full Moon Scimitar 新圆月弯刀 (2012), Full Moon Curved Saber The Magic Blade 天涯‧明月‧刀 (2012), (Tianya Mingyue Dao - Horizon, Bright Moon, Sabre), Xiaoli Feidao Series (Fu Hong Xue) Detective and Doctors 陆小凤与花满楼 (2015), Lu Xiaofeng Series Xin Xiao Shi Yi Lang 新萧十一郎 (2016), Xiao Shi Yi Lang series Border Town Prodigal (2016), Xiaoli Feidao Series (Ye Kai & Fu Hong Xue) The Legend of Flying Daggers 小李飛刀系列 (2016), Xiaoli Feidao Series (Li Huai) The Lost Swordship 飄香劍雨 (2017), Lingering Fragrance in a Rain of Swords 
 Handsome Siblings 絕代雙驕 (2020), Juedai ShuangjiaoTranslations of works
Xiong's works have been translated into many languages such as French, English and Vietnamese:

 The Eleventh Son, English translation of Xiao Shiyilang, .
 Les quatre brigands du Huabei, French translation of Huanle Yingxiong,''

See also
 Jin Yong
 Liang Yusheng

Notes

References

Further reading
 Stateless Subjects: Chinese Martial Arts Literature and Postcolonial History, Chapter 5. Petrus Liu. (Cornell University, 2011)
《傲世鬼才一古龙：古龙与武侠小说国际学术研讨会论文集》林保淳 （学生书局出版，2006）

External links
 HKMDB - Database of works.
 
 Gu Long Reading Room – A webpage of fan translations.
 Wuxia Translations Forum – Wuxia translations forum by fans.
 Qiqi.com – Gu Long's works in Chinese

 
1938 births
1985 deaths
Deaths from cirrhosis
Affiliated Senior High School of National Taiwan Normal University alumni
Tamkang University alumni
Wuxia writers
Hong Kong writers
Taiwanese male novelists
Republic of China writers
Alcohol-related deaths in Taiwan
Hong Kong emigrants to Taiwan